Prayer For Judgement Continued is a judicial action unique to the U.S. state of North Carolina, allowing traffic violators and some misdemeanor offenders to plead guilty to an offense and then ask for a "Prayer For Judgement" from the judge. If granted, the offense is not entered against the defendant. The offense is still documented, but points are not added to the offender's driving record. In most cases, Prayer for Judgments can only be granted twice in five years per household, and they are not granted to commercial drivers. They are also not available in cases where the law specifies a mandatory punishment.

The website for the North Carolina Judicial Branch says that "there are circumstances when a PJC still will be considered a conviction for the purposes of driver's license and [auto] insurance points".

References

North Carolina law